The Westwind 24, also called the Paceship P 24,  is a Canadian trailerable sailboat that was designed by Ted Hood as a cruiser and first built in 1966.

Production
The design was built by Paceship Yachts in Canada, starting in 1966, but it is now out of production.

Design
The Westwind 24 is a recreational keelboat, built predominantly of fibreglass, with wood trim. It has a masthead sloop rig; a spooned, raked stem; a raised counter, reverse transom, an internally mounted spade-type rudder controlled by a tiller and a fixed, rounded long keel with a retractable centreboard. It displaces  and carries  of lead ballast.

The boat is normally fitted with a small  outboard motor for docking and manoeuvring. The motor is mounted in a well in the lazarette.

The design has sleeping accommodation for four people, with a double "V"-berth in the bow cabin and two straight settee berths in the main cabin. The galley is located on both sides, just aft of the bow cabin. The galley is equipped with a sink to port and an ice box to starboard. The head is located in the bow cabin under the "V"-berth.

For sailing downwind the design may be equipped with a symmetrical spinnaker.

Operational history
 	
The boat was at one time supported by an active class club, The Paceship, but since the death of the club organizer the club is inactive, pending efforts to restart it.

In a 2010 review Steve Henkel wrote, "Ted Hood founded Hood Sailmakers, which during the 1960s turned into the world's largest sailmaker. Also in the 1960s he began designing yachts, and eventually became a boatbuilder, founding Little Harbor Yachts. In 1967 he designed the deep-bellied whalelike hull you see here for Paceship Yachts of Mahone Bay, Nova Scotia. The design may look unconventional, but close inspection reveals some advantages. Above the waterline, the hull is quite conventional, but the lower midships section descends into a deep V down where ballast is most effective ... The hull depth also permits a lower cabin sole which together with a doghouse in the cabintop yields the most headroom compared to her comps. Best features: In general, owners seem quite satisfied with their choice of boat. Worst features: Despite her good headroom, plus cabin cabin sides which are very close to the gunwales (leaving very little room to walk forward), the boat has a lower Space Index than any of her comp[etitor]s."

See also
List of sailing boat types

References

Keelboats
1960s sailboat type designs
Sailing yachts
Trailer sailers
Sailboat type designs by Ted Hood
Sailboat types built by Paceship Yachts